The Inter Varsity Dance Competition (IVDC) is an annual student dancesport competition organised by Inter Varsity Dance Association (IVDA). The IVDA write rules regarding entries, dress code and which dances will be part of the competition.

All UK universities may send representatives provided they are a member of the IVDA, and students who study at universities that do not have teams may gain special consideration to dance for another university. 27 UK universities took part in the 2022 IVDC.

Whilst dancesport in the UK has seen a decline that shows like Strictly Come Dancing have rectified, the Inter Varsity Dance Association (IVDA) has remained consistently popular and struggles to find a UK venue large enough for its annual competition. Since 2007 the competitions have been hosted at the Winter Gardens, Blackpool.

At this time there is no student equivalent in other countries although the US has a strong student scene, and mainland Europe is building up its own competition scene.

Competition and events
IVDC is an annual event running since 1962 and hosted by different UK member universities and normally occurs in February or March each year. There are individual competitions during the day in ballroom, Latin, rock'n'roll, offbeat and the Team Match.

For the Latin and Ballroom Events students are divided according to experience: Beginner, Novice, Intermediate and Advanced. Ex Students are also able to compete in some competitions. In lower ranking competitions dress restrictions apply. Beginners are encouraged and there is the "Best Beginners Team Trophy" which presented to the university with the most successful beginners overall.
Other individual returnable trophies available:
The Timur Olegovich Gulinskiy Advanced modern Trophy (In memory of a Leeds Dancesport Student who died whilst studying in 2000)
The Novice Modern Trophy 
The Intermediate Modern Trophy
The Far’s Advanced Latin Trophy 
The Novice Latin Trophy 
The Intermediate Latin Trophy 
Ex-students ballroom trophy 
Ex-students Latin trophy
The Dance Basics best Beginners’ Trophy (awarded to the Beginner couple finishing highest over all four Beginners’ events) 
The Choice of London Rock ‘n’ Roll Trophy 
The Edna Murphy Shield (presented to the most promising couple, as decided by the Chairman of Adjudicators)
The Far’s Dance Best Newcomer Trophy (awarded to the couple who receive the highestmarks in the team match and who have never competed in an IVDC team match before)

The Offbeat Competition is a "Fun" team "freestyle" even - the university can enter a 3-minute routine in any dance style. Interpretations vary from fun routines such as "The Full Monty" to serious high quality street dance routines. The Offbeat Winners Shield is presented to the winning team.

The most important event of the competition is the team match, which pits teams of 32 dancers from each member university against each other (These are split into teams of 8: A, B, C, D). This competition has undergone a drastic overhaul in recent years following innovations by Alistair Braden whilst at Bristol University. The team match is now a two-division system that ranks all universities entered, instead of the traditional team match.
The following Team Trophies are awarded at IVDC:
The EADA Overall IVDA Champions Trophy (presented to the university placed first in the overall rankings) 
The Choice IVDA Overall Runners-Up Trophy
The Far’s Dance A-Team Winners Trophy 
The Choice IVDA A-Team Runners-Up Trophy 
The B-Team Winners Shield 
The IDTA B-TEam Runners-Up Trophy 
The C-Team Winners Shield 
The IDTA C-Team Runners-Up Trophy 
The D-Team Winners Trophy 
The IDTA D-Team Runners-Up Trophy 
The EADA IVDA Division 2 Winners Trophy 
The Choice IVDA Division 2 Runners-Up Trophy 
The IVDA Challenge Trophy (presented to the highest-placed university composed entirely of teams in division 2)

The trophies held in the highest regard are the EADA Overall trophy and the A-Team trophy.

History of results

See also
Ballroom dance
Competitive dance
Dance basic topics

References

External links
Inter Varsity Dance Association Constitution
IVDA home page for more rules, dates and guidelines and to see which universities have representatives
IDTA
EADA
European Students Dancesport Tournament
Links to American Collegiate Dancesport

Dancesport competitions
Ballroom dance competitions
Dance in the United Kingdom